The following is a list of films produced, co-produced, and/or distributed by Warner Bros. in 2010–2019. This list does not include direct-to-video releases.

See also 
 List of New Line Cinema films
 List of films based on DC Comics
 List of Warner Bros. theatrical animated feature films
 :Category:Lists of films by studio

References 

Lists of Warner Bros. films
Warner Bros. films
Warner Bros